Rivinletto Light is a sector light tower located on Kaasamatala, a small island at the mouth of river Kiiminkijoki in Haukipudas, Oulu, Finland. The tower is concrete, with its top half painted black and bottom half painted white. The steel lantern room is painted white. The tower is located on the south side of the main channel of Kiiminkijoki river.

The light is used to guide vessels into the Kiiminkijoki river boating channel and into the Martinniemi harbour. It displays a white flash every three seconds, visible in a sector 016°—248° as seen from a vessel approaching the light.

References

Lighthouses completed in 1939
Lighthouses in Finland
Gulf of Bothnia
Buildings and structures in Oulu